Giorgio Borruso is an Italian architect, known for his designs of international retail fashion houses. Since 2000, Borruso's firm has been based in Venice, Los Angeles, California.

Career
Borruso has attended universities in Italy and Spain. In 2000, he relocated his firm to Venice, Los Angeles, California.

Borruso first received attention in 2001 with the Miss Sixty showroom in South Coast Plaza. His works have received over 170 international design awards. Several of his works are included in museum collections internationally, including the Chicago Athenaeum and the Red Dot Museum in Essen, Germany. Borruso was named Retail Design Luminary in 2006, and Designer of the Year in 2005 by DDI magazine. His recent works include Lord & Taylor in New York, Carlo Pazolini in Milan, New York, Rome, and London, and the Snaidero USA showroom in New York City.

Selected awards and honors 
 German Design Prize (Germany 2013)
 Design Practice of the Year - FX Design Awards (UK 2012)
 Red Dot: BEST OF THE BEST Design Award (Germany 2012)
 Retail Design Institute Store Carlo Pazolini in Milan : STORE DESIGN AWARD and INNOVATIVE CONCEPTUAL DESIGN (2011)
 International Architecture Award (Chicago Athenaeum) (2010, 2008)
 GOOD DESIGN Award (2008, 2007, 2006, 2006, 2005)
 NASFM Retail Design Award (2005, 'Store of the Year’ 2006)
 Institute of Store Planners/VM+SD International Store Design Award (‘Store of the Year’ 2004, 2005, 2006)

External links 
 GIORGIO BORRUSO DESIGN's official website
 Interior Design, "Best of Year Awards" (2007)
 Interior Design, "Snaidero Coral Gables, Florida" (December 2007)
 Interior Design, "Fila's grand slam: Borruso puts some major topspin on a New York flagship, the protopype for an international rollout" (April 2006)

References 

1968 births
Living people
Architects from Sicily